Charles Bourchier (1665-1716)  was a soldier and politician who sat in the Irish House of Commons at various times between 1692 and 1716.

Bourchier was a gentleman of the regiment of horse commanded by Lord Windsor. He married  Barbara Harrison, daughter of Richard Harrison of Balls, Hertfordshire and MP for Lancaster. He was buried at the parish church of Clontarf, Dublin At the 1692 Irish election he was elected  Member of Parliament for Dungarvan  and was re-elected for the parliament from 1695 to 1699. In 1715 he was elected MP for Armagh Boroughs and held the seat until his death.

Bourchier died on 18 May 1716 aged 52. His son Richard Bourchier became Governor of Bombay.

References

1665 births
1716 deaths
Irish MPs 1692–1693
Irish MPs 1695–1699
Irish MPs 1715–1727
Members of the Parliament of Ireland (pre-1801) for County Waterford constituencies
Members of the Parliament of Ireland (pre-1801) for County Armagh constituencies